Roger Lau (born in 1977) is an American political consultant who served as the campaign manager for Elizabeth Warren's 2020 presidential campaign. Lau is the deputy executive director of the Democratic National Committee.

Early life 
Lau was born in Woodside, Queens, New York to parents from Guangzhou, China. He has two brothers. His parents worked many jobs including driving instructors, takeout restaurant owners, etc. He attended the Bronx High School of Science but dropped out. After receiving a GED, he went to the University of Massachusetts Amherst where he majored in political science and minored in Chinese. While at UMass, he interned for John Kerry. Lau graduated in 2000, and planned to return to New York; instead he was hired by John Kerry's staff and asked for a job working with constituents.

Career 
Lau started his career working with Kerry, including his 2004 presidential campaign. While working on the campaign, he met former United States president Bill Clinton and United States Senator Hillary Clinton, for whom he now provides consultancy on Massachusetts-related politics. He also worked on Kerry's Senate 2008 re-election campaign. 

Lau briefly worked in the United States Department of Commerce for President Barack Obama.

After the death of Ted Kennedy who served in the Senate for 48 years, a series of losses led Lau to the Senate campaign of Elizabeth Warren. He later became the manager of her presidential campaign.

In 2021, Lau was named Deputy Executive Director of the Democratic National Committee.

Personal life 
Lau is partnered with Amanda Coulombe, a political field organizer who emphasizes technology, and they reside in Somerville, Massachusetts.

References 

1977 births
Living people
People from Woodside, Queens
American people of Chinese descent
People from Somerville, Massachusetts
University of Massachusetts Amherst College of Social and Behavioral Sciences alumni
American campaign managers
Elizabeth Warren
The Bronx High School of Science alumni